Guest in the House (re-release title Satan in Skirts) is a 1944 American film noir directed by John Brahm starring Anne Baxter and Ralph Bellamy.

Lewis Milestone began directing the film in April 1944, but was stricken with appendicitis in May 1944 and collapsed on the set. John Brahm then stepped in to direct.

Plot
Martha Proctor believes something evil has come to her home. Her nephew Dr. Dan Proctor arrives with his betrothed, Evelyn Heath, who is a frail invalid. Evelyn is introduced to Aunt Martha as well as Dan's older brother, Douglas, an illustrator, along with Douglas's wife Ann and his model, Miriam.

The women sympathize with Evelyn, knowing of the hard life she has had. Evelyn has bouts of hysteria, involving her fear of birds, and also keeps a secret diary in which she mocks her fiancé Dan and expresses a desire for Douglas instead.

While plotting to seduce Douglas, and accusing Dan of jealousy to make him leave, Evelyn next sets out to rid the house of Miriam, whom she sees as a rival. Her gossip succeeds in getting back to Aunt Martha and turning everyone's suspicions to Miriam, who departs.

Douglas then quarrels with Ann, driven apart by Evelyn's diabolical schemes. Evelyn goes so far as to destroy the goodbye note Ann has written to him. By the time everyone realizes who's behind all this and decide to commit Evelyn to an asylum, a hysterical Evelyn flees from the house, screaming, and plunges to her death.

Cast

Reception
The film earned a profit of $50,000.

Critical response
Bosley Crowther, the film critic for The New York Times, gave the film a mixed review when it first opened, writing, "For a more cracked and incredible tale than this quaint one of a mischief-making female has not lately disturbed the screen. As a play by Hagar Wilde and Dale Eunson, it had a moderate run, we understand, but as a film it is openly in peril of being laughed into a quick decline. The fault is as much in the story as it is in the handling by all concerned, for the story is cheaply synthetic and about as logical as a crooner's song...Nor is any help rendered by Anne Baxter, who plays the wrecker with so much coyness that anyone, shy of a blind man, could see that she was up to tricks. And Ralph Bellamy is equally ridiculous as a middle-aged Byronic beau who tries to be boyish and amorous and also solemn and wise. Miss MacMahon remains in the background, which is a happy place for one in this film, while Ruth Warrick, Scott McKay and Jerome Cowan get entwined with the torturings up front. Mr. Stromberg is an eminent producer, but his grip certainly slipped on this job."

Accolades
Nominations
 Academy Awards: Best Music, Scoring of a Dramatic or Comedy Picture; Werner Janssen; 1945.

See also
List of American films of 1944

References

External links

 
 
 
 
Review of film at Variety
 

1944 films
1940s thriller drama films
American black-and-white films
Film noir
Films directed by John Brahm
United Artists films
Films based on works by Hagar Wilde
American thriller drama films
1944 drama films
American films based on plays
Films scored by Werner Janssen
1940s English-language films
1940s American films